Patrick Joseph Kiernan (6 June 1929 – 6 May 2003) was an Irish equestrian. He competed in two events at the 1956 Summer Olympics.

References

External links
 

1929 births
2003 deaths
Irish male equestrians
Olympic equestrians of Ireland
Equestrians at the 1956 Summer Olympics
Place of birth missing